Mara Sacchi (born 3 November 1948) is a retired Italian freestyle swimmer. She competed at the 1964 Olympics in the 100 m and 4 × 100 m freestyle relay and reached the final in the relay.

Sacchi's brother Massimo and nephew Luca are also Olympic swimmers.

References

External links
 
 
 

1948 births
Living people
Italian female swimmers
Italian female freestyle swimmers
Olympic swimmers of Italy
Swimmers at the 1964 Summer Olympics
Mediterranean Games medalists in swimming
Mediterranean Games silver medalists for Italy
Swimmers at the 1967 Mediterranean Games
20th-century Italian women